Shady Grove may refer to:

Places
In the United States
Shady Grove Township, Searcy County, Arkansas
Shady Grove, Washington County, Arkansas
Shady Grove, Illinois
Shady Grove, Iowa
Shady Grove, Kentucky
Shady Grove, Maryland, a suburb of Washington, D.C.
Shady Grove (WMATA station), the Washington Metro station that serves Shady Grove, Maryland
Shady Grove Adventist Hospital
Shady Grove, Dallas County, Missouri
Shady Grove, Pulaski County, Missouri
Shady Grove, Cherokee County, Oklahoma
Shady Grove, McIntosh County, Oklahoma
Shady Grove, Pawnee County, Oklahoma
Shady Grove, Pennsylvania
Shady Grove, Tennessee (disambiguation) — a large number of unincorporated communities
Shady Grove, Texas (disambiguation)
Shady Grove, Virginia
Shady Grove (Gladys, Virginia), a historic house

Music
"Shady Grove" (song), an American folk song
Shady Grove (Quicksilver Messenger Service album), 1969
Shady Grove (Jerry Garcia and David Grisman album), 1996
Shady Grove, an album by the Figgs, 2019

Other
Shady Grove (biological warfare trials) 1964, 1965; series 64-4 of Project SHAD / Project 112;  formerly named "RED BEVA."
Shady Grove Orthopedic Associates, P.A. v. Allstate Insurance Co., 559 U.S. 393 (2010). A US Supreme Court decision ruling on issues pertaining to the Erie doctrine.